Polyommatus (Agrodiaetus) violetae, the Andalusian anomalous blue, is a species of butterfly in the family Lycaenidae. It is found in the south (subspecies violetae) and south-east (subspecies subbaeticus) of Spain. Adults are on wing from July to August.

Subspecies 
Two subspecies:
Polyommatus (Agrodiaetus) violetae violetae (Gómez-Bustillo, Expósito & Martínez, 1979)
Type locality: Sierra de Almijara, south-eastern Málaga province, southern Andalusia region, southern Spain
The larvae feed on Onobrychis argentea argentea

Polyommatus (Agrodiaetus) violetae subbaeticus Gil-T. & Gil-Uceda, 2005)
Type locality: Sierra de la Sagra, northern Granada province, north-eastern Andalusia region, south-eastern Spain.
The larvae feed on Onobrychis argentea hispanica
Note: the taxon subbaeticus was described as a subspecies of  Agrodiaetus fabressei (Oberthür, 1910), but molecular studies have demonstrate that belongs to the species violetae.

Synonyms
Agrodiaetus violetae violetae = Agrodiaetus fabressei violetae Gómez-Bustillo, Expósito & Martínez, 1979
Agrodiaetus violetae subbaeticus = Agrodiaetus fabressei subbaeticus Gil-T. & Gil-Uceda, 2005

Combination
Valid combination: Agrodiaetus violetae Gómez-Bustillo, Expósito & Martínez, 1979

References 

 (2008): Description of the pre-imaginal stages of Agrodiaetus violetae (Gómez-Bustillo, Expósito & Martínez, 1979) and notes about compared ecology and morphology (Lepidoptera: Lycaenidae). Atalanta 39 (1/4): 343-346, 422-423. Full article: .
 (2005): Agrodiaetus violetae (Gómez-Bustillo, Expósito & Martínez, 1979): Morfología comparada y descripción de Agrodiaetus fabressei subbaeticus ssp. nov. del sureste de la Península Ibérica (Lepidoptera, Lycaenidae). Boletín de la Sociedad Entomológica Aragonesa 36: 357-364. Full article: .
 (2012): Contribution to the knowledge of Agrodiaetus violetae Gómez-Bustillo, Expósito & Martínez, 1979 sensu lato, an endemic Iberian species; new localities and first records for Sierra Nevada and Almeria province (S. Spain) (Lepidoptera,: Lycaenidae). Atalanta 43 (1/2): 91-94. Full article: .
 (2010): How common are dot-like distributions? Taxonomical oversplitting in western European Agrodiaetus (Lepidoptera, Lycaenidae) revealed by chromosomal and molecular markers. Biological Journal of the Linnean Society Vol. 101(1): 130–154. Full article: .

Polyommatus
Butterflies of Europe
Butterflies described in 1979